Linowiec  is a village in the administrative district of Gmina Grodziczno, within Nowe Miasto County, Warmian-Masurian Voivodeship, in northern Poland.

References

Linowiec